The 2018–19 Quinnipiac Bobcats women's basketball team represents Quinnipiac University  during the 2018–19 NCAA Division I women's basketball season. The Bobcats are led by twenty-fourth year head coach, Tricia Fabbri, played their home games at People's United Center and were members of the Metro Atlantic Athletic Conference. They finished the season 26–7, 18–0 in MAAC play to win MAAC regular season and tournament titles to earn an automatic trip to the NCAA women's tournament. They lost to South Dakota State in the first round.

Roster

Schedule

|-
!colspan=9 style=| Non-conference regular season

|-
!colspan=9 style=| MAAC regular season

|-
!colspan=9 style=| MAAC Women's Tournament

|-
!colspan=9 style=| NCAA Women's Tournament

Rankings
2018–19 NCAA Division I women's basketball rankings

See also
 2018–19 Quinnipiac Bobcats men's basketball team

References

Quinnipiac Bobcats women's basketball seasons
Quinnipiac
Quinnipiac